Ritesh Shah is an Indian screenwriter who works in Hindi films. He has written the screenplay and dialogues for films like Kahaani (2012), Pink (2016), Airlift (2017) and Raid (2018). He won the Filmfare award, Star Screen Award and Zee Cine Award in the Best Dialogue category for Pink.

Early life and education
He did his Bachelors in English Literature from Hindu College (1993-1996) and has done his Masters in Mass Communications from MCRC, Jamia Milia Islamia. He began his career as a playwright with Act One Art Group, New Delhi. His works include the fringe award winner Othello - A play in black and white. Ritesh switched to television in 1999. His television writing credits  include Josh, Kashmeer, Krishna Arjun  and the award-winning series Kagaar.

Career
Ritesh started his career as a playwright in Delhi. He adopted Sławomir Mrożek's political black comedy which pulled the attention of the Indian film industry. One of the actors in the play suggested him to shift the base to Mumbai where Ritesh started writing from the TV serial Kagaar. His first film as a writer was Sujoy Ghosh's Home Delivery. Anurag Kashyap recommended him to Vipul Shah for writing the dialogues of 2007 film Namastey London. He has also adopted 2013 film B.A. Pass from a short story "The Railway Aunty" written by Mohan Sikka. Initially he was planning to turn three stories into a film from a short story collection titled Delhi Noir. Then he wrote a screenplay of 45 pages based on "The Railway Aunty" and presented it to the director Ajay Bahl who liked the script and went ahead making it a film.  He has also done a cameo role in Pink.

Awards and nominations

Filmography

References

External links
 

Hindi screenwriters
Filmfare Awards winners
Screenwriters from Delhi
Indian male screenwriters
People from Anantnag
1976 births
Living people
Hindu College, Delhi alumni
Jamia Millia Islamia alumni